Andrzej Stretowicz (born February 23, 1976) is a Polish footballer who played in the Ekstraklasa for Stomil Olsztyn.

External links
 

1976 births
Living people
Polish footballers
Korona Kielce players
Lechia Gdańsk players
OKS Stomil Olsztyn players
Pomezania Malbork players
Ząbkovia Ząbki players
Quang Nam FC players
People from Tczew
Sportspeople from Pomeranian Voivodeship
Association football forwards
Polish expatriate footballers
Expatriate footballers in Vietnam
Polish expatriate sportspeople in Vietnam
Expatriate footballers in the Faroe Islands
Polish expatriate sportspeople in the Faroe Islands